Fredi Walker-Browne (née Walker) is an American actress.

Life and career 
She is an alumna of New York University.

Her Broadway debut was the role of Joanne Jefferson, the high-class lawyer and lover of Maureen Johnson (Idina Menzel), in the original Broadway cast of Rent. At 33, Walker-Browne was the oldest of the eight principal cast members. The role garnered her an Obie and a Fanny Award. She also toured nationally with The Lion King as Rafiki.

In 2005, her role of Joanne in the film version of Rent was played by Tracie Thoms. Walker stated that she was not offered the film role due to her age. At her request, however, the producers cast an actress of African descent.

In 2012, she had a recurring guest spot on the Showtime series The Big C.

She is the founder and president of Big Spoon Productions, which produces and directs screenplays and teleplays. Walker-Browne is currently a voice instructor at the Music and Art Academy in Matawan, New Jersey.

Filmography

References

External links 
 
 

20th-century American actresses
21st-century American actresses
American film actresses
American musical theatre actresses
American stage actresses
American television actresses
Living people
Year of birth missing (living people)